Uruyiella is an extinct genus of laidleriid temnospondyl from Late Triassic Buena Vista Formation of Uruguay. It was first named by Graciela Piñeiro, Claudia Marsicano and Nora Lorenzo in 2007, from a nearly complete skull. The type species is Uruyiella liminea and it is the only close relative of the enigmatic Early Triassic Laidleria.

References 

Carnian genera
Triassic temnospondyls of South America
Triassic Uruguay
Fossils of Uruguay
Paraná Basin
Fossil taxa described in 2007